San Miguel Partido is a partido in the Greater Buenos Aires urban area of Buenos Aires Province in Argentina.

Districts
 Bella Vista
 Campo de Mayo
 Muñiz 
 San Miguel

References

External links

 

 
1994 establishments in Argentina
Partidos of Buenos Aires Province